John Smith III (born May 13, 1980), commonly known as L. J., which stands for "Little John", is a former American football tight end in the National Football League (NFL). He was drafted by the Philadelphia Eagles in the second round of the 2003 NFL Draft. He played college football at Rutgers.

Early years
In elementary school, he went to Bartle in Highland Park. At Highland Park High School in Highland Park, New Jersey, Smith played both basketball and football. As a senior football linebacker, he posted 11 sacks, 143 tackles, and five interceptions.

College years
A four-year starter, he finished second in Rutgers history among tight ends with 122 receptions for 1,458 yards and ten touchdowns, surpassed only by Marco Battaglia.

Smith earned All-Big East honors as both a junior and senior, and served as team captain as a senior, leading the Scarlet Knights with a career-high 32 receptions for 384 yards and three touchdowns.

Professional career

Philadelphia Eagles
Smith was drafted by the Philadelphia Eagles in the second round of the 2003 NFL Draft. As a rookie, he backed up Chad Lewis, and had 27 receptions for 321 yards and a touchdown. Coach Andy Reid worked Smith and Lewis both into the offense with two tight-end sets, and Smith had 34 receptions, 377 yards and five touchdowns in 2004. That season, the Eagles reached Super Bowl XXXIX and Smith made an impressive diving reception in the back of the end zone for the Eagles' first touchdown of the game, though they would go on to lose to the New England Patriots 24-21.

With the retirement of Chad Lewis and suspension of Terrell Owens, Smith became one of Donovan McNabb's top targets; between 2005 and 2006, Smith led the Eagles in receptions, receiving yards and receiving touchdowns.

Entering the final year of his contract in 2007, Smith suffered a hernia injury that could have possibly kept him out for the season. Smith however did recover in time for the season opener, though the injury would limit him for much of the year. Unable to reach an agreement on a long-term deal, the Eagles placed the franchise tag on Smith for the 2008 season.

Baltimore Ravens
Smith signed a one-year, $1.5 million deal with the Baltimore Ravens on March 20, 2009. In his lone season in Baltimore (plagued by injuries) Smith had only two catches for 31 yards, and had no starts backing up Todd Heap.

Personal life
Smith was included in the 2005 Chunky Soup commercials featuring Donovan McNabb. He enjoys playing basketball and was a tremendous basketball prospect who drew interest from a number of Division I programs including Florida State and various schools from the Metro Atlantic Athletic Conference. He currently resides in Longport, New Jersey. He currently owns and operates a Plato's Closet store in Edison, New Jersey. Inspired by his mother, Smith returned to Rutgers and in 2016 completed his undergraduate degree.

References

External links
Ravens Bio

1980 births
Living people
Highland Park High School (New Jersey) alumni
People from Highland Park, New Jersey
People from Longport, New Jersey
American football tight ends
Rutgers Scarlet Knights football players
Philadelphia Eagles players
Baltimore Ravens players
Sportspeople from the Delaware Valley
Sportspeople from the New York metropolitan area